The first version of this article has been based in the text of the Greek Wikipedia published under GFDL.

Local football championships of Greece are lowest leagues of the Greek Football. The participants are only amateur clubs from various Greek cities or villages. Every Football Association has its own league and at the end the winner of each Association Championship plays knock-out matches against other Associations winners. The current football associations in Greece are:

Achaea Football Clubs Association - 1927
Aetoloacarnania Football Clubs Association - 1968
Argolida Football Clubs Association - 1964*
Arcadia Football Clubs Association - 1939
Aris Archangelos Football Club - 1947
Arta Football Clubs Association - 1981
Athens Football Clubs Association- 1924
Piraeus Football Clubs Association - 1925
East Attica Football Clubs Association - 2004
West Attica Football Clubs Association - 2004
Boeotia Football Clubs Association -
Chalkidiki Football Clubs Association -
Chania Football Clubs Association - 1950
Chios Football Clubs Association - 1939
Corfu Football Clubs Association -
Corinthia Football Clubs Association -
Cyclades Football Clubs Association -
Drama Football Clubs Association -
Dodecanese Football Clubs Association - 1947
Epirus Football Clubs Association -
Euboea Football Clubs Association -
Evros Football Clubs Association -
Evrytania Football Clubs Association - 1981
Florina Football Clubs Association -
Grevena Football Clubs Association -
Heraklion Football Clubs Association - 1929
Ilia Football Clubs Association - 1969
Karditsa Football Clubs Association -
Kastoria Football Clubs Association - 1978
Kavala Football Clubs Association - 1930
Kefalonia and Ithaca Football Clubs Association - 1980
Kilkis Football Clubs Association -
Kozani Football Clubs Association - 1957
Laconia Football Clubs Association -
Larissa Football Clubs Association - 1960
Lasithi Football Clubs Association -
Lesbos Football Clubs Association - 1948
Macedonia Football Clubs Association - 1923
Central Macedonia Football Clubs Association -
East Macedonia Football Clubs Association - 1930
Northwest Macedonia Football Clubs Association - 1984
Messenia Football Clubs Association -
Pella Football Clubs Association - 1971
Phocis Football Clubs Association - 1985
Phthiotis Football Clubs Association - 1930
Pieria Football Clubs Association - 1980
Preveza and Lefkada Football Clubs Association -
Rethymno Football Clubs Association - 1951
Samos Football Clubs Association -
Serres Football Clubs Association -
Thesprotia Football Clubs Association -
Thessaly Football Clubs Association - 1929
Trikala Football Clubs Association - 1975
Xanthi Football Clubs Association -
Zakynthos Football Clubs Association - 1987

(defunct)
Athens-Piraeus Football Clubs Association - 1919–1924
Smyrna Football Clubs Association - 1898–1922

External links
 Greek FA (EPO) Official site (results are also available there)

Football in Greece
4
Gre
Association football governing bodies in Greece